Carina Vitral Costa (born July 6, 1988) is a Brazilian politician and student and former president of Brazil's National Union of Students (UNE) . She was born in Santos and is affiliated to the Communist Party of Brazil.

References 

1988 births
Living people
Communist Party of Brazil politicians
Brazilian communists
People from Santos, São Paulo